Events from the year 1862 in China.

Incumbents 
 Tongzhi Emperor (1st year)
 Regent: Empress Dowager Cixi
 Regent: Prince Gong

Events 
 Nian Rebellion
 Taiping Rebellion
 Battle of Shanghai (1861)
 Battle of Cixi
 Taiping troops approach southeastern Shaanxi in the spring of 1862, the local Han Chinese, encouraged by the Qing government, formed Yong Ying militias to defend the region against the attackers. Afraid of the now-armed Han, the Muslims formed their own militia units as a response.
 Miao Rebellion (1854–73)
 Dungan Revolt (1862–77) begins
 June — Siege of Xi'an
 Panthay Rebellion
 rebel commander Ma Rulong surrenders and defects to the Qing 
 Tongzhi Restoration

Deaths 
 Frederick Townsend Ward, mortally wounded in the Battle of Cixi
 Auguste Léopold Protet, French naval officer killed in Shanghai

References